Ripon College may refer to:

Ripon College (Wisconsin), a liberal arts college in Ripon, Wisconsin, United States
The former name of Outwood Academy Ripon, a school in North Yorkshire, England
Ripon College Cuddesdon, a theological college in Oxfordshire, England
Ripon College, Calcutta, the former name of Surendranath College, an undergraduate college in Kolkata, India, that is affiliated to the University of Calcutta
Ripon College of Education, a former teacher training college in North Yorkshire, England, now part of York St John University

See also
 Rippon College